Sacred mountains are central to certain religions, and are usually the subjects of many legends. For many, the most symbolic aspect of a mountain is the peak because it is believed that it is closest to heaven or other religious realms. Many religions have traditions centered on sacred mountains, which either are or were considered holy (such as Mount Olympus in Greek mythology) or are related to famous events (like Mount Sinai in Judaism, Christianity and descendant religions or Mount Kailash in Hinduism). In some cases, the sacred mountain is purely mythical, like the Hara Berezaiti in Zoroastrianism. Mount Kailash is believed to be the abode of the deities Shiva and Parvati, and is considered sacred in four religions: Hinduism, Bon, Buddhism, and Jainism. Volcanoes, such as Mount Etna in Italy, were also considered sacred, Mount Etna being believed to have been the home of Vulcan, the Roman god of fire and the forge.

Themes of sacrality 
Edwin Bernbaum, a preeminent scholar of sacred mountains around the world, suggests that although no single, universal theme underlies all sacred mountains across the globe, it is possible to identify certain patterns that help to clarify the principal roles that sacred peaks play in different cultures. Bernbaum identifies the following ten themes expressed through sacred mountains that are particularly widespread in cultures around the world, summarized below. A particular sacred mountain may have one or more of these themes represented in it; some may have nearly all of them.  

 Height: When we look at a mountain the first thing to impress us is usually not its central location, but its height, which evokes an immediate response of wonder and awe. Poised above the surrounding landscape, set in a fluid realm of drifting clouds and flowing sky, its summit appears to float in another world, higher and more perfect than the one in which we dwell.
 Center: The view of the mountain as the center appears in its most comprehensive form as a central axis linking together the three levels of the cosmos – heaven, earth, and hell or underworld. As the link between heaven earth, and hell, it acts as a conduit of power, the place where sacred energies, both divine and demonic, spew into the world of human existence. 
 Power: Many sacred mountains are revered as places of awesome power manifested in various ways – natural, supernatural, and even political.
 Deity or abode of deity: As places of power and heavens on high, mountains serve as abodes of gods and goddesses, often situated at the center of the cosmos, world, or region.
 Temple or place of worship: Mountains often appear in the form of temples housing the deities who reside on or within them. As centers and high places open to the sky, mountains provide altars for making offerings to gods and spirits. Also, mountains may take the form of places of worship, viewed or imagined as shrines, churches, and cathedrals.
 Paradise or garden: Modern societies share with traditional cultures the widespread view of mountains as sacred gardens and earthly paradises.
 Ancestors and the dead: Whether revered as heavens or feared as hells, mountains have a widespread and important role as hallowed places of the dead. In many cases, the resemblance of mountains to tombs, which often mimic the shape of hills, make them natural places of burial. In seeing mountains as abodes of the dead, people often regard them as the places from which their ancestors came – or as those ancestors themselves.
 Identity: As divine ancestors, mountains provide many societies with their identity and cohesiveness.
 Source: People throughout the world look up to mountains as sources of innumerable blessings, sometimes attributed to the ancestral spirits dwelling within them. For many cultures the most important of these blessings is water. Other blessings that flow from sacred mountains include fertility, health, and well-being, as well as treasures of various kinds.
 Revelation, transformation, inspiration, and renewal: As places of power, close to heaven, mountains serve as dramatic sites of revelation, transformation, inspiration and renewal. The revelation or vision on a mountain often transforms the person who receives it. Hermits of traditions around the world seek out mountains as places to transform themselves through practices of physical austerity and spiritual contemplation. Poets and mystics have visualized the ascent of the sacred mountain as a symbol of the ultimate pilgrimage, leading to the heights of heaven and the final goal of spiritual realization. For lay people who do not aspire to the supreme heights of spiritual transcendence or enlightenment, mountains serve as places where they can find inspiration and renewal.

Purpose and use

Community identity 
History shows that mountains were commonly part of a complex system of mountain and ancestor worship. Having immortalized fallen brethren in the edifice, the people share a common allegiance with all the other people of a community. The meanings that were etched into the mountain and mound terrain connected the villagers. They were all subject to the same landscape and village history, which were bound together by their cultural significance. The history of ancestors could be told by simply pointing at specific mountains and remembering the stories that were passed down throughout the generations. The worship of ancestors and the mountains were largely inseparable. An interconnected web between history, landscape, and culture was thus formed. One example is the Hindu belief that Mount Kailash is the final resting place for the souls of the dead, as well as the large cemetery placed on Mount Kōya-san.

Sacred mountains can also provide an important piece of a culture's identity. For example, Bruno Messerli and Jack Ives write, "The Armenian people regard Mount Ararat, a volcano in eastern Turkey believed to be the site of Noah's Ark in the Bible, to be a symbol of their natural and cultural identity". As a result of the mountain's role as a part of a cultural identity, even people who do not live close to the mountain feel that events occurring to the mountain are relevant to their own personal lives. This results in communities banning certain activities near the mountain, especially if those activities are seen as potentially destructive to the sacred mountain itself.

Pilgrimages

To date, Kailash has never been climbed, largely due to the fact that the idea of climbing the mountain is seen as a major sacrilege. Instead, the worshipful embark on a pilgrimage known as the kora. The kora consists of a 32-mile path that circles the mountain, which typically takes five days with little food and water. Various icons, prayer flags, and other symbols of the four religions that believe Kailash is sacred mark the way. To Buddhists and Hindus, the pilgrimage is considered a major moment in a person's spiritual life. One circuit is believed to erase a lifetime of sin, while 108 circuits is believed to ensure enlightenment.

Sacred Mountains are often seen as a site of revelation and inspiration. Mount Sinai is an example, as this is the site where the covenant is revealed to Moses. Mount Tabor is where it is supposed Jesus was revealed to be the Son of God. Prophet Muhammed is said to have received his first revelation on Mount Noor. The mountains' roles as places of revelation and transformation often serve to attract tourists as much as they do religious pilgrims. However, in some cases, the financial revenue is overlooked and sacred mountains are conserved first due to their role in the community.

Members of the Aetherius Society conduct pilgrimages to 19 mountains around the world that they describe as being "holy mountains".

Mount Tomorr, a holy mountain for Albanians, is one of the most frequented sacred places in Albania. Remarkable annual pilgrimages to this mountain take place during the second half of August.

By country and region 

Various cultures around the world maintain the importance of mountain worship and sacredness. One example is the Taranaki peoples of New Zealand. The Taranaki tribe view Mount Taranaki as sacred. The tribe was historically sustained by this mountain's waterways. As in other instances in Māori mythology, the mountain is anthropomorphized in various stories. For the tribespeople, Mount Taranaki has a deep spiritual significance and is seen as a life force. It is viewed as the place where life is given and to where people are returned after death.

America

Navajo

The Navajo possess a strong belief system in regards to the natural-supernatural world and have a belief that objects can have supernatural qualities. For example, the Navajo consider mountains to be sacred. There are four peaks, which are believed to have supernatural aspects. The mountains each represent a borderline of the original Navajo tribal land. The mountain ranges include Mount Taylor, the San Francisco Peaks, Blanca Peak, and Hesperus Peak located in the La Plata Mountains.

Each mountain/peak is representative of a color, direction, and correlates with a cultural light phenomenon dealing with the cosmic scheme of the rising and of the setting sun. Directionally, the mountains are described in a clockwise motion following the movement of the Sun beginning with the eastern mountain of Blanca Peak. Blanca Peak is associated with the color white and the "Dawn Man" referring to the rising of the sun. Next in the south is Mount Taylor, which is associated with the color blue and the "Horizontal Blue Man" referring to the daytime. In the west is the San Francisco Peaks, which is representative of the color yellow and the "Horizontal Yellow Woman" and is associated with the setting of the sun. And finally in the north is the Hesperus Peak of the La Plata Mountains which is given the color black and belongs to the light phenomenon of the "Darkness Woman" representing night-time.

Inca

The ancient Inca displayed a connection with death and their mountains. It is well known by scholars that the Inca sensed a deep reservoir of spirituality along the mountain range. Situating their villages in the mountains, they felt these places acted as portal to the gods. Ritual child sacrifices called Capachochas were conducted annually, where the most precious gift that could be given (innocent, blemishless, perfect human life) would be sacrificed to the gods. Tremendous effort would be taken as the sacrificial victims would be paraded alive throughout the cities, with multiple festivals and feasts taking place. The final destination would be the tops of some of the highest mountains near their villages, leaving these sacrifices to freeze in the snow. These would take place during great times of distress, during times of famine, violent periods of war, and even during times of political shift. This connection with the mountain as a sacred space is paramount. There would be no other place that would be sufficient or acceptable enough for the gods to accept these gifts. It is neither a surprise nor a coincidence that their honored dead were placed on the highest peaks of the mountains to express the shared connection between the sacred mountain, the gods, and the dead.

China 

In China, many different sets of sacred mountains exist, each associated with a different religious tradition: Taoism and Chinese Buddhism. The sacred mountains have all been important destinations for pilgrimage by laymen, monks and emperors for centuries, with the Chinese expression for pilgrimage (朝圣; 朝聖; cháoshèng) being a shortened version of an expression which means "paying respect to a holy mountain" (朝拜圣山; 朝拜聖山; cháobài shèng shān).

Buddhism 

Chinese Buddhism recognizes four sacred mountains, which are each associated with a specific bodhisattva. They consist of Mount Putuo, Mount Wutai, Mount Jiuhua and Mount Emei. Mount Putuo is associated with the bodhisattva Guanyin and is identified by Chinese Buddhists as the Mount Potalaka mentioned in Buddhist scriptures as being the bodhisattva's bodhimaṇḍa (with the word "Putuo" being a contraction of "Pǔtuóluòjiā", the Mandarin pronunciation of "Potalaka"). Since the Tang dynasty (618 - 907), the mountain has been the center of Guanyin veneration in China. It is home to more than 30 temples, the most prominent of which are Fayu Temple, Puji Temple and Huiji Temple. Mount Wutai is associated with the bodhisattva Manjusri, who is believed to frequently appear on the mountain, taking the form of ordinary pilgrims, monks, or most often unusual five-colored clouds. It is home to over 360 temples which date back to the Tang dynasty (618 - 907), such as Puhua Temple and Longhua Temple. It is also home to some of the oldest wooden buildings in China that have survived since the era of the Tang dynasty (618 - 907), including the main hall of Nanchan Temple and the East Hall of Foguang Temple, built in 782 and 857, respectively. Mount Jiuhua is associated with the bodhisattva Ksitigarbha. It was identified as the bodhisattva's bodhimaṇḍa after Kim Qiaoque, a prince from the Silla Kingdom on the Korean peninsula, came there in 719 and cultivated himself for 75 years. After dying, his corporeal body stayed intact. Because he was very similar in appearance to iconography of Ksitigarbha, the monks there believed he was the reincarnation of the bodhisattva. As a result, the mountain came to be associated with Ksitigarbha. During the Ming and Qing dynasties, there were over 360 temples located at the mountain. In contemporary times, the temple is home to over 93 temples, with more than 10,000 Buddha statues. Mount Emei is associated with the bodhisattva Samantabhadra and is the location of the first Buddhist temple built in China in the 1st century CE. It is home to over 76 Buddhist monasteries, most of which were constructed during the Ming dynasty (1368 - 1644).

Taoism 

Taoism recognizes numerous sacred mountains. Of these, a grouping of five mountains, which are arranged according to the five cardinal directions of Chinese geomancy (which includes the center as a direction), have been regarded as the most important. The grouping of the five mountains appeared during the Warring States period (475 BC – 221 BC), and the term Wuyue ("Five Summits") was made popular during the reign of Emperor Wudi of the Western Han Dynasty (140-87 BC). In Chinese traditional religion they have cosmological and theological significance as the representation, on the physical plane of earth, of the ordered world emanating from the God of Heaven (Tian–Shangdi), inscribing the Chinese territory as a tán (壇; 'altar'), the Chinese concept equivalent of the Indian mandala. Since the early periods in Chinese history, they have been the ritual sites of imperial worship and sacrifice by various emperors. Mount Tai, which is regarded as the foremost of the five mountains, is regarded believed to be the abode of the Great Deity of Mount Tai (Chinese: 东岳大帝; pinyin: Dōngyuè Dàdì) and is associated with the east, sunrise, birth, and renewal. Religious worship of Mount Tai has a tradition dating back 3,000 years, dating back to the Shang dynasty (c. 1600–1046 BC). By the time of the Zhou Dynasty (c. 1046–256 BC) sacrifices at Mount Tai had become highly ritualized ceremonies in which a local feudal lord would travel there to make sacrifices of food and jade ritual items. Later, numerous Emperors from various ruling dynasties would continue to hold Taoist ceremonies at the mountain, such as Emperor Gaozong of Tang, whose ceremony was attended by representative from Japan, India, the Persian court in exile, Goguryeo, Baekje, Silla, the Turks, Khotan, the Khmer, and the Umayyad Caliphate. This site is now home to over 22 temples, 97 ruins, 819 stone tablets, and 1,018 cliff-side and stone inscriptions. The other four sacred mountains are: Mount Hua in Shaanxi (associated with the west), Mount Heng in Hunan (associated with the South), Mount Heng in Shanxi (associated with the north), and Mount Song in Henan (associated with the centre). Another famous grouping of sacred Taoist mountains consist of: Mount Longhu, Mount Qiyun, Mount Qingcheng and the Wudang Mountains. In addition, numerous other mountains which are not part of any particular groupings have also been recognized as sacred in Taoism, such as the Kunlun Mountains, which is believed to be the abode of Xiwangmu (Chinese: 西王母; pinyin: Xīwángmǔ), a goddess who is associated with death, warfare, pestilence, shamanism as well as life and immortality.

Greek 

Mount Olympus is the highest mountain peak in Greece. It was once regarded as the "home of the Greek Gods/The Twelve Olympians of the Hellenistic World". It was also considered the site of the War of the Titans (Titanomachy) where Zeus and his siblings defeated the Titans.

Mount Othrys is a mountain in Central Greece, which is believed to be the home of the Titans during the ten-year war with the Gods of Mount Olympus.

Mount Ida, also known as Mountain of the Goddess, refers to two specific mountains: one in the Greek island of Crete and the other in Turkey (formerly known as Asia Minor).

Mount Ida is the highest mountain on the island of Crete is the sacred mountain of the Titaness Rhea, also known as the mother of the Greek Gods. It is also believed to be the cave where Greek God Zeus was born and raised.

The other Mount Ida is located in Northwestern Turkey alongside the ruins of Troy (in reference to the Hellenistic Period). The mountain was dedicated to Cybele, the Phrygian (modern-day Turkey) version of Earth Mother. Cybele was the goddess of caverns and mountains. Some refer to her as the "Great Mother" or "Mother of the Mountain". The mythic Trojan War is said to have taken place at Mount Ida and that the Gods gathered upon the mountaintop to observe the epic fight. Mount Ida in Turkey is also represented in many of the stories of Greek author Homer such as Iliad and Odyssey.

Mount Athos, located in Greece, is also referred to as the Holy Mountain. It has great historical connections with religion and classical mythology. In Roman Catholic and Eastern Orthodox forms of Christianity, it is believed that after the Ascension of the Lord, the Virgin Mary landed on the island and came upon a pagan temple. It was there that the pagan practitioners converted from paganism to Christianity. The Virgin Mary then blessed the land and claimed it her own.

In classical mythology, Mount Athos is named after the Thracian giant who battled Poseidon, God of the Sea, during the clash of the titans and Gods. It is also said that Greek historian was given the task of creating a canal through the mountain after the failed journey of Persian leader, Xerxes. Over time, Alexander the Great has become associated with the mountain for his worldly powers. The myth states that Greek architect Dinocrates had wanted to carve Alexander the Great's figure onto the top of the mountain in tribute to him.

Japan 
In Japan, Mount Kōya is the home to one of the holiest Buddhist monastery complexes in the country. It was founded by a saint, Kukai, who is also known as Kōbō Daishi and is regarded as a famous wandering mystic; his teachings are famous throughout Japan and he is credited with being an important figure in shaping early Japanese culture. Buddhists believe that Kobo Dashi is not dead, but will instead awake and assist in bringing enlightenment to all people, alongside the Buddha and other bodhisattvas. It is believed that he was shown the sacred place to build the monastery by a forest god; this site is now the location of a large cemetery that is flanked by 120 esoteric Buddhist temples. Approximately a million pilgrims visit Mount Kōya a year; these pilgrims have included both royals and commoners who wish to pay their respects to Kobo Dashi. Mount Fuji is another sacred mountain in Japan. Several Shinto temples flank its base, which all pay homage to the mountain. A common belief is that Mount Fuji is the incarnation of the earth spirit itself. The Fuji-kō sect maintains that the mountain is a holy being, and the home to the goddess Sengen-sama. Annual fire festivals are held there in her honor. It is also the site of pilgrimages; reportedly, 40,000 people climb up to its summit every year.

India 

In India, especially in Indian-origin religions (Hinduism, Buddhism, Jainism and Sikhism), nature worship is a part of core beliefs, and many mountains and forests are considered sacred. Most sacred among those are Mount Kailash (in Tibet), Nanda Devi, Char Dham mountains, Pamir Mountains as Mount Meru, Kanchenjunga and Amarnath mountain, Gangotri mountain, Yamunotri mountain, Sarasvotri mountain (origin of Sarasvati River), Dhosi Hill, Tirumala Hills, etc.

Korea 

In Korea, people have maintained ancient ways of worshiping mountain spirits. While they are not in fact worshiping the land itself, the gods associated with this worship are united to the land. These spirits are female entities to whom people pay tribute while passing by the mountains, asking for good luck and protection. People also travel to these mountains to ask for fertility. While people generally hold to these female deities for protection or to perpetuate life, one of their most important functions is to protect the dead. The ponhyangsansin is a guardian spirit that is protecting an important clan grave site in the village. Each mountain goddess has an equally interesting story that is tied to their accounts of war against Japan, and the historical legacy of their emperors. Each spirit learned difficult lessons and experienced some sort of hardship. These legacies in the mountains serve as a kind of monument to the history of Korea. While many of the accounts may be true, their details and accuracy are shrouded by time and ritual. While the inaugurations of new ponhyang san sin are not being conducted, fallen important clansmen and leaders are strategically placed in the mountains in order for these strong, heroine-like spirits may fiercely guard their graves. The history of Korea is in turn protecting its own future.

Middle East 

According to the Torah, and consequently the Old Testament of the Bible, Mount Sinai is the location that Moses received the Ten Commandments directly from God. The tablets form the covenant, which is a central cornerstone of Jewish faith. Saint Catherine's Monastery is located at the foot of Sinai. It was founded by empress Helena, who was the mother of the first Christian Roman emperor, Constantine. It was completed under the rule of Justinian two centuries later. The monastery was visited by the prophet Muhammed, who blessed it and promised "that it would be cherished by Muslims for all time". Today, the monastery is home to a group of Greek Orthodox monks, as well as a large collection of Byzantine art, illuminated manuscripts, icons, and books; the collection of icons in particular has been proclaimed one of the oldest in the world.

Tibet 

Tibet's Mount Kailash is a sacred place to five religions: Buddhism, Jainism, Hinduism, Bon Po (a native Tibetan religion prior to Buddhism), Sikhism and Ayyavazhi religions. According to Hinduism and Ayyavazhi, Mount Kailash is the home of the deity Shiva. In Hindu religion, Mount Kailash also plays an important role in Rama's journey in the ancient Sanskrit epic, Ramayana. Buddhists hold that Mount Kailash is the home of Samvara, a guardian deity. Buddhists believe that Mount Kailash has supernatural powers that are able to clean the sins of a lifetime of any person. Followers of Jainism believe that Kailash is the site where the founder of Jainism reached enlightenment. Bon Po teaches that Mount Kailash is the home of a wind goddess. Followers of Sikhism believe the 1st Sikh Guru, Guru Nanak arrived at Mt. Kailash during the 3rd Uddasi (divine journey) and debated with the Siddhas.

Mount Meru is a cosmic mountain which is described to be one of the highest points on Earth and is the centre of all creation. In the Hindu religion, it is believed that Meru is home to the god Shiva and Parvati. In Indian classical mythology, it is believed that the sun, moon, and stars all revolve around Mount Meru. Folklore suggests the mountain rose up from the ground piercing the heavens, giving it the moniker "the navel of the universe".

Vietnam 

In Vietnam, the Ba Vì mountain range is called "the lord of mountains" (núi chúa) in the Vietnamese spirit though it is not the highest mountain range in Vietnam. In addition, there is the Bảy Núi mountain range - a sacred mountain range in Southern Vietnam, considered the place where Maitreya Buddha opened the Hội Long Hoa, the final judgment, ending the hạ ngươn period (the end of the Dharma) and opened a thượng ngươn new life of happiness and peace. An indicator sign is that by that time, from the treasure mountain (Bửu Sơn) will emit a wonderful fragrance (Kỳ Hương).

Albanians 

The cult of the mountain and mountain tops is widespread among Albanians. Pilgrimages to sacred mountains take place regularly during the year. This ancient practice is still preserved today, notably in Tomorr, Pashtrik, Lybeten, Gjallicë, Rumia, Koritnik, Shkëlzen, Mount Krujë, Shelbuem, Këndrevicë, Maja e Hekurave, Shëndelli and many others. In Albanian folk beliefs the mountain worship is strictly related to the cult of Nature in general, and the cult of the Sun, the earth and water in particular. Every mountain is said to have its own nymph (Zana e malit), who get their specific name according to the top of the mountain where the nymphs stay. For instance Mount Pashtrik is the dwelling of Zana e Pashtrikut.

List of sacred mountains
A non-exhaustive alphabetical list of sacred mountains is as follows:

 Adam's peak (Sri Pada) – second highest peak in Sri Lanka, regarded sacred by 5 religions of Buddhists, Hindus, Muslims, Christians and native Chinese faith
 Áhkká – regarded by the Sámi people as a holy mountain
 Arunachala – Tamil Nadu, India
 Bảy Núi – An Giang, Vietnam
 Black Hills – South Dakota, United States
 Ba Vì mountain range – Hanoi, Vietnam
 Burkhan Khaldun – Khentii Province, Mongolia
 Ceahlău Massif – Romania; the most important peak is Toaca (1904 m altitude) 
 Croagh Patrick – Mayo, Ireland
 Dakpa Sheri – Tibet
 Emei Shan – China
 Gyeryongsan – highly sacred mountain and national park in South Korea
 Jabal al-Nour – near Mecca, Saudi Arabia
 Jabal Thawr – Saudi Arabia, mountain cave where Muhammad and his companion Abu Bakr hid from Quraish during migration to Medina
 Jirisan – highly sacred mountain-cluster and national park in South Korea
 Montserrat – near Barcelona, Spain
 Mount Athos – also known as the Holy Mountain, Greece
 Mount Aqraa (Zaphon) – Turkey–Syria border
 Mount Akhun – the sacred mountain of Ubykhia
 Mount Ararat – alleged by some to be the site of Noah's ark and holy to the Armenian Apostolic Church
 Mount Carmel – Israel
 Mount Damavand – Iran
 Mount Everest –  China–Nepal border
 Mount Fuji – Japan
 Mount Gerizim – as claimed taught to be the location of the Holies of Holies by God to the Samaritans
 Mount Graham – considered by Apache to be sacred. Believed to be Stargate by some. Site of court battle between the Vatican Observatory, and Apache
 Hua Shan – China
 Mount Roraima – Brazil
 Huang Shan – China
 Mauna Loa/Mauna Kea – volcanic eruptions were thought to be a result from the Hawaiian Goddess of fire Pele (deity) when in argument with her siblings
 Machu Picchu, Huayna Picchu, and other mountains were sacred to the Inca locals
 Mount Arayat – Philippines
 Mount Banahaw – Philippines
 Mount Kailash – India, sacred to Hinduism, Buddhism, Jainism and Bön
 Mount Kenya – central Kenya, traditionally sacred to the Kikuyu ethnicity in Kenya
 Mount Kilimanjaro, sacred to Chaga people who believe god Ruwa resides on the top
 Mount Kinabalu – also known as "Aki Nabalu", sacred to Kadazan-Dusun people of Sabah in Malaysia
 Mount San Cristobal in Philippines
 Mount Diwata – Philippines
 Mount Lao – Qingdao, China
 Mount Lantoy – Philippines
 Mount Makiling – Philippines
 Mount Murud – highest mountain in Sarawak sacred to Lun Bawang people in their Christian faith
 Mount of Olives – Israel
 Nanda Devi – the Bliss-Giving Goddess in India sacred to Hindus
 Mount Paektu – sacred to all Koreans, also a subject of the North Korean cult of personality, North Korea/China
 Phnom Kulen – Cambodia
 Mount Sahand – Iran
 Mount Ecclesia – Oceanside, California, United States; a high mesa with a holy solar temple, spiritual healing ceremonies, and a record of spiritual visions
 Mount Tacoma/Mount Rainier, decade volcano in Washington state sacred to indigenous tribes to it being a "mother's breast" that nourishes the land with fresh water
 Mount Shasta – California, United States
 Mount Sinai – Egypt
 Mount Sinjar – Iraq, sacred to the Yazidis
 Mount Tabor – Israel
 Mount Zion – Jerusalem, Israel
 Odaesan – highly sacred mountain and national park in South Korea
 Sulayman Mountain – Kyrgyzstan
 Taebaeksan – highly sacred mountain and national park in South Korea
 Tai Shan – China
 Teide – Tenerife, Canary Islands, Spain, sacred to the aboriginal Guanches
 Temple Mount – Jerusalem, Israel
 Uluru (Ayers Rock) – Northern Territory, Australia
 Mount Etna – Sicily, Italy
 Mount Vesuvius – Naples, Italy
 Wudang Shan – China

Conservation

Sacred mountains are often viewed as the source of a power which is to be awed and revered. Often, this means that access to the sacred mountain is restricted. This could result in climbing being banned from a sacred mountain completely (as in the case of Mount Kailash) or for secular society to give the mountain a wide berth. Because of the respect accorded to a mountain's sacred power, many areas have been declared off limit for construction and remain conserved. For example, a large amount of forest has been preserved due to its proximity to Mount Kōya-san. Additionally, sacred mountains can be seen as the source of something vital. This could be a blessing, water, life, or healing. Mount Kailash's role as the source for four major rivers is celebrated in India and not simply seen as mundane. Rather, this also adds to its position as a sacred place, especially considering the sacred position of the Ganges river in Indian culture. Mountains that are considered home to deities are also central to prayers for the blessings from the gods reputed to live there. This also creates a sense of purity in the source of the mountain. This prompts people to protect streams from pollution that are from sacred mountains, for example.

Views of preservation and sacredness become problematic when dealing with diverse populations. When one observes the sacred mountain of the Sacramento Valley in the United States, it becomes clear that methods and opinions stretch over a vastly differing body of protesters. Shasta Mountain was first revered by the Native American tribe, the Wintu. Shasta was in effect a standing monument for the individuals of their cultural history. This bounded view of sacred mountains changed drastically during the 1800s. It is commonly assumed that sacred mountains are limited by a single society, trapped in a time capsule with only one definition to explain it: the indigenous tribe. Shasta's glory had expanded to multiple regions of the world, communities of differing religions making their pilgrimage up to the summits of this glorious mountain. The Wintu tribe did not hold a monopoly on the sacredness anymore. There were others contesting to the meanings, adding new rituals and modifying old ones. With the advent of new technology and desires to turn this mountain into a skiing lodge, angry voices from all over the world rose up with variants of demands on why and how we should preserve this beautiful mountain.

Almost every day different religious practices such as nude bathing, camping out with magic crystals, yoga, and many "quasi-Christian" groups such as the I AM march their ways up to the tips of this mountain. With this activity the mountain pathways become clustered, cluttered and littered. Even the pathways' existence leads to erosion, and further slow degradation of the mountain. The Wintu tribe has voiced concerns and asked for support from the government to regulate the activities practiced on "their" mountain saying that "they are disturbed by the lack of respect" shown for this piece of land. It has become greatly debated if the more vulnerable and "spiritually desirable" places of the mountain should be closed and maintained only by the Wintu tribe, who see this land as a sacred graveyard of their ancestors, or open to all who seek spiritual fulfillment such as the modern-day group of the I AM.

See also

 Sacred related 
 Sacred groves
 Bodhi Tree
 Largest Banyan trees
 Sacred groves of India
 Sacred trees
 Trees in mythology
 Tree worship
 Sacred natural site
 Sacred rivers
 Sacred site

 General
 List of types of formally designated forests
 Superlative trees
 Tree hugger (disambiguation)
 World mountain

References

External links
Sacred Mountains
Heilige Berge (German)
Sacred Mountains and Sanshin mountain-spirits of Korea
Sacred Mountains and other sites, by Martin Gray (spirituality scholar)